Anurag Singh may refer to:

Anurag Singh (cricketer, born 1975), Indian-born cricketer who played in English county cricket during the 1990s and 2000s
Anurag Singh (cricketer, born 1990), Indian cricketer for Madhya Pradesh
Anurag Singh (director), Indian film director from Punjab
Anurag Singh (filmmaker) (born 1968), Indian filmmaker from Varanasi
Anurag Singh (musician) (born 1966), Indian musician from Amritsar
Anurag Singh (politician) (born 1971), Indian politician from Uttar Pradesh